The 1961 Humboldt State Lumberjacks football team represented Humboldt State College during the 1961 NCAA College Division football season. Humboldt State competed in the Far Western Conference (FWC).

The 1961 Lumberjacks were led by head coach Phil Sarboe in his eleventh year at the helm. They played home games at the Redwood Bowl in Arcata, California. Humboldt State finished ranked #16 in the UPI small college poll. They were co-champion of the FWC with a record of eight wins and two losses (8–2, 4–1 FWC). The Lumberjacks outscored their opponents 239–112 for the season.

Schedule

Notes

References

Humboldt State
Humboldt State Lumberjacks football seasons
Northern California Athletic Conference football champion seasons
Humboldt State Lumberjacks football